Josephine Clay "Dody" Ford (July 7, 1923 – June 1, 2005) was an American philanthropist and the only granddaughter of Henry Ford.

Early life
Josephine was born in Dearborn, Michigan on July 7, 1923.  She was the only daughter and third of four children born to Edsel Ford and his wife Eleanor Lowthian (née Clay) Ford.  Her siblings included Henry Ford II, who also served as chairman and CEO of Ford Motors, and William Clay Ford Sr.

Her father was the only child of Henry Ford, founder of Ford Motors.

Personal life

In 1943, she married Walter Buhl Ford II (1920–1991), not a relative, whose family were prominent in the chemical business in the downriver suburbs of Detroit.  He was a descendant of the other prominent families of Detroit including the banking Fords, the Buhl family and Brush family.  Walter Ford was himself involved in interior and industrial design and was the chairman and chief executive of Ford & Earl Design Associates.  They lived in Grosse Pointe Farms, Michigan and together were the parents of two sons and two daughters:

 Walter Buhl Ford III (1943–2010)
 Eleanor Clay "Nonie" Ford Sullivan (b. 1946), who was married to Frederic Avery Bourke Jr. in 1967.  Bourke is a part owner of Dooney & Bourke, the leather company. They divorced and she remarried, to John Sullivan Jr., and lives at 960 Fifth Avenue in New York City.
 Josephine Clay "Joey" Ford Ingle (b. 1949), who married John William Ingle Jr. in 1971.
 Alfred Brush Ford (b. 1950), who joined the Hare Krishna movement and renamed himself Ambarish Das.

Dody and her husband were also art collectors and owned paintings by Vincent van Gogh, Pierre-Auguste Renoir and Pablo Picasso.  Walter died in 1991 of pancreatic cancer.  Dody died on June 1, 2005 at the Henry Ford Hospital in Detroit.

Philanthropy
In 2001, Time magazine estimated her net worth at approximately $416 million.  In 2005 at the time of her death, she owned more than 13 million shares of Ford Motor stock.

Josephine and Walter Ford were major contributors to the College for Creative Studies (a $20,000,000 donation in 1997) and the Detroit Institute of Arts among other institutions.  Dody donated Van Gogh's Portrait of the Postman Joseph Roulin, which was valued at $40,000,000, to the Detroit Institute of Arts in 1996.  She also donated large amounts of money for cancer research leading to the formation of the Josephine Ford Cancer Center.

See also
 Ford family tree

Sources

External links

1923 births
2005 deaths
Henry Ford family
American philanthropists